Stephanie Sant'Ambrogio (born July 15, 1960) is an American violinist. She is assistant professor of violin and viola at the University of Nevada, Reno and served as concertmaster of the San Antonio Symphony from 1994 until 2007, during which time she appeared annually as soloist with the orchestra. Her father is cellist John Sant'Ambrogio.

External links
 

American classical violinists
American classical violists
Women violists
Concertmasters
Texas classical music
1960 births
Living people
University of Nevada, Reno faculty
21st-century classical violinists
21st-century violists